Edward Fitzsimmons Dunne (October 12, 1853 – May 24, 1937) was an American politician who was the 24th Governor of Illinois from 1913 to 1917 and previously served as the 38th mayor of Chicago from April 5, 1905 to 1907. Dunne is the only person to be elected both Mayor of Chicago and Governor of Illinois.

Early years
Born in 1853, in Watertown, Connecticut, he was the son of an ardent Irish nationalist, Patrick William (P. W.) Dunne (1832–1921), who emigrated to America in 1849 after the failed Young Ireland revolt. His mother, Delia Mary (Mary) Lawlor, was the daughter of a prosperous Irish contractor, and participant in the Irish Rebellion of 1798, who helped construct the docks of Galway.

The family moved to Peoria, Illinois in 1855 while Dunne was still an infant, and he was educated there in the public schools. Dunne had three sisters.  His father refused to send his son to the local Catholic academy, because the Catholic Church had spoken out against the activities of the Fenians.

P. W. Dunne was a prosperous businessman, active in both Irish and American politics. He raised money for the Fenians, gave generously of his own funds, and frequently hosted Irish politicians, political exiles, and rebels in his home when they traveled to Chicago.  P. W. Dunne served on the Peoria City Council in the 1860s and was elected to the Illinois House of Representatives.

Education and early career
After Dunne graduated from high school in Peoria in 1871, he was sent to Ireland to attend Trinity College in Dublin. His father wanted his son to be educated at the alma mater of Irish patriot, Robert Emmet. Among his classmates was the author Oscar Wilde. Dunne did extremely well at Trinity, but was forced to leave one year short of graduation, after his father suffered a financial setback.

Dunne returned to Illinois, and finished his education at Union College of Law in Chicago (that was jointly run by Northwestern University and the Old University of Chicago), where his family had settled in 1877. He graduated from the Union College of Law in 1878.  He married Elizabeth F. Kelly, the daughter of Edward F. Kelly, a Chicago businessman, and his wife, Kitty Howe Kelly, on August 16, 1881. Following his marriage he started a prosperous legal practice.  The Dunnes had thirteen children, with nine of them surviving into adulthood.  His children included:  Eileen Dunne Corboy, Mona T. Leonard, Maurice Dunne, Richard Dunne, Jeanette Dunne, Edward F. Dunne, Jr., Geraldine Dunne, Eugene Dunne, and Judge Robert Jerome "Duke" Dunne.

Circuit court judgeship
In 1892, at age 28, Dunne was elected judge of the Circuit Court in Chicago and served from 1892 to 1905.

During his judgeship, he was also elected the first president of the Irish Fellowship Club of Chicago in 1901. He had played a key role in the formation of this organization.

Mayoralty
Dunne resigned his judgeship to run for mayor in January 1905, winning election on April 4, 1905, beating the Republican John Maynard Harlan. Dunne won with majorities in 22 of 35 wards in the city. The final tally was 161,189 votes for Dunne and 138,671 given to Harlan. His election was greeted with jubilation by social reformers throughout the nation. He was formally inaugurated on April 10, 1905 in the council of chambers in Chicago. At the annual Jefferson Day banquet held shortly after his inauguration, he was praised by William Jennings Bryan and Mayor Tom L. Johnson as a dynamic new leader of the national movement for reform. The primary issue which Dunne had campaigned upon, and the primary issue he would focus on as mayor, was the city's traction issue, for which he sternly favored having a solution which would result in immediate municipal ownership of the city's streetcar lines. As his primary assistant, Dunne chose Clarence Darrow, who was given the title of "Special Traction Counsel to the Mayor". After Darrow resigned from this role in November 1905, in 1906 Dunne appointed Walter L. Fisher as his replacement.

As Mayor, Dunne was instrumental in reducing the price of gasoline in Chicago from $1.00 to 85 cents, and of water from 10 cents to 7 cents per thousand gallons. He was also a strong proponent of municipal ownership of public utilities.

Dunne was defeated in his bid for reelection in 1907 by Republican Fred A. Busse.

A 1994 survey of experts on Chicago politics saw Dunne ranked as the tenth-best mayor in the city's history up to that point.

Post-mayoralty
After his mayoralty ended on April 15, 1907, Dunne returned to his legal practice.

Dunne was narrowly defeated in the 1911 Democratic mayoral primary by another former Chicago mayor, Carter H. Harrison II, who went on to regain the Mayor's office.

Governorship
Dunne formally announced his candidacy for Governor of Illinois  on January 17, 1912. He won the Democratic Party primary election held on April 9 of that year. The main thrust of his campaign attack was on what he called "Jackpot Government".  In the general election, Dunne defeated the incumbent governor, Governor Charles S. Deneen in the fall of 1912. Dunne and the Democrats benefited from the split in the ranks of the Republican Party which divided by supporters of the incumbent President William Howard Taft and the Progressives who supported the third party candidacy of Theodore Roosevelt.

He was inaugurated as Governor of Illinois on February 3, 1913.  He moved his family to the Illinois Governor's Mansion in Springfield, Illinois. As governor, he met with many visitors and guests. Former U.S. President, Theodore "Teddy" Roosevelt was a visitor to meet with Dunne at the Illinois Governor's Mansion while Dunne was governor.

As governor Dunne championed numerous progressive reforms, including Women's Suffrage, prison reforms, major infrastructural improvements, the creation of the Public Utility Commission, the Efficiency and Economy Commission, the Legislative Reference Bureau, and he also expanded the state's responsibility for overseeing workman's compensation benefits and teachers' pensions.

In 1913, Governor Dunne signed into law a bill that gave women in the State of Illinois the right to vote for President of the United States.  This made Illinois the first state east of the Mississippi to give women the right to vote for the U.S. Presidency.  This was six (6) years before the passage of the 19th Amendment.

In November 1915, Dunne designated state Senator Stephen D. Canady of Hillsboro to appear as his representative on the train car along with the Liberty Bell as it passed through southern Illinois on its nationwide tour returning to Pennsylvania from the Panama-Pacific International Exposition in San Francisco.  After that trip, the Liberty Bell returned to Pennsylvania and will not be moved again.

Post-gubernatorial career
After finishing his term as governor, Dunne remained politically active. In 1921, he helped found an organization called the "National Unity Council" to combat the Ku Klux Klan.

In 1919, Dunne was appointed by the Irish Race Convention to serve on the American Commission on Irish Independence. As part of this commission, Dunne traveled to the Paris Peace Conference of 1919 in order to voice Irish-American desires for an independent Irish nation. During his stay in Europe, he also visited Ireland itself. He spent ten days touring the island and meeting with politicians including members of the First Dáil on May 9, 1919.

Dunne returned once again to practicing law after leaving office in 1917. His legal practice was damaged by the ravages of the Great Depression, but he supplemented this work with a position as counsel to the Cook County Board of Election Commissioners.

After the death of his wife on May 25, 1928, Dunne began contemplating his memoirs. He was convinced by the Lewis Publishing Co. to write a history of Illinois.  Over a five-year period he worked on this project with close help from William L. Sullivan, who had been his private secretary when he was governor. In 1933, he published a five (5) volume set titled: Illinois, the Heart of the Nation.

President Franklin Roosevelt appointed Dunne to be a United States Commissioner for the Century of Progress World's Fair of Chicago of 1933-34.  At the time he was 80 years old. He took great joy in this position and joked that he had served as mayor, governor and as a federal commissioner (and, thus, had served at all levels of government).

Death
In his later years, Edward F. Dunne lived with his oldest daughter, Eileen and her family. He died in Chicago on May 24, 1937, aged 83. He was surrounded by three of is nine children when he died. He is buried alongside his wife Elizabeth at Calvary Cemetery in Evanston. Edward’s great great grandson is technologist and venture capitalist James McKenna IV, founder of Adrenaline Trading and Cloud Boss

See also

Chicago Traction Wars

References

Further reading
 Edward Fitzsimmons Dunne Collection, 1873-1937, Illinois History and Lincoln Collections, University of Illinois at Urbana-Champaign.
 Morton, Richard Allen. Justice and Humanity: Edward F. Dunne, Illinois Progressive. Carbondale, Ill.: Southern Illinois University Press, 1997. 
 Sullivan, William Larkin. Dunne: Judge, Mayor, Governor. Chicago: Windermere Press, 1916

External links

 Public Transportation and the Failure of Municipal Socialism in Chicago, 1905-1907
 Chicago and Municipal Ownership, by Edward F. Dunne, National Magazine, June 1905

1853 births
1937 deaths
Northwestern University Pritzker School of Law alumni
Democratic Party governors of Illinois
Mayors of Chicago
Politicians from Peoria, Illinois
American people of Irish descent
People from Watertown, Connecticut
Catholics from Connecticut
Catholics from Illinois
American activists for Irish independence
Burials at Calvary Cemetery (Evanston, Illinois)